This is a timeline of women's suffrage in Rhode Island. Women's suffrage in Rhode Island started with women's rights activities, such as convention planning and publications of women's rights journals. The first women's suffrage group in Rhode Island was founded in 1868. A women's suffrage amendment was decided by referendum on April 6, 1887, but it failed by a large amount. Finally, in 1917, Rhode Island women gained the right to vote in presidential elections. On January 6, 1920, Rhode Island became the twenty-fourth state to ratify the Nineteenth Amendment.

19th century

1850s 
1850

Paulina Wright Davis is the chair of the National Women's Rights Convention in Worcester, Massachusetts.
1852

Anna W. Spencer publishes The Pioneer and Woman's Advocate.

1853

 Davis publishes The Una.

1860s 
1868

October 23: Elizabeth Buffum Chace and Paulina Wright Davis attend the founding meeting of the New England Women's Suffrage Association.
December 11: The Rhode Island Woman Suffrage Association (RIWSA) is formed by Chace and Davis.
1869

 RIWSA petitions the Rhode Island General Assembly for a women's suffrage amendment.

1870s 
1873

 Three women run unsuccessfully for school committee office: Elizabeth Churchill, Sarah Doyle, and Rhoda Peckham.

1874

 Three women are elected to the Providence School Committee: Anna E. Aldrich, Elizabeth C. Hicks and Abby D. Slocum.

1880s 
1884

 RIWSA held their annual meeting at the Old Statehouse with Susan B. Anthony and Frederick Douglass in attendance.
1885

 A women's suffrage amendment bill is introduced by Representative Edward L. Freeman in the General Assembly.

1886

 The women's suffrage amendment passes both houses of the General Assembly. It has to pass one more time to be valid.

1887

 The women's suffrage amendment again passes both houses and will now go out for a voter referendum.
April 6: The election for the amendment is held, but it fails.
August 11: The New England Woman Suffrage Association (NEWSA) held a conference in the Casino Theatre in Newport.

1890s 
1892

 A "special appeal" goes before the general assembly for women in Rhode Island to vote in presidential elections.

1895

Jeanette S. French speaks at a hearing in the senate of the general assembly.

1897

 A commission to revise the state constitution is appointed by the governor.
May 11: Suffragists present their objections to the Constitutional Committee.

20th century

1900s 
1902

 Suffragists in Rhode Island get the endorsement of the State Central Trades and Labor Unions.
1903

 Providence Mayor, Daniel L. D. Granger, endorses women's suffrage.
 Mary H. Dickerson founds the Rhode Island Union of Colored Women's Clubs.

1907

December: The Rhode Island College Equal Suffrage League is formed.
1908

 Cora Mitchell forms the Newport County Woman Suffrage League.

1909

Alva Belmont hosts a series of women's suffrage lectures at the Marble Palace.

1910s 
1912

 A branch of the Rhode Island Association in Opposition to Woman Suffrage is formed in Newport.

1913

 The Rhode Island Women's Suffrage Party is created.
 Bertha G. Higgins convinces the Rhode Island Union of Colored Women's Clubs to endorse women's suffrage.
1914

 Alva Belmont holds the Conference of Great Women at the Marble House.

1915

 The Rhode Island Women's Suffrage Party, RIWSA, and the Rhode Island College Equal Suffrage League merge to form the Rhode Island Equal Suffrage Association.
September 15: Rhode Island suffragists, Ingeborg Kindstedt and Maria Kindberg, accompany Sara Bard Field on a cross country trip by car.
1914

 Wife of Governor Charles Warren Lippitt, Margaret Farnum Lippitt, testifies against women's presidential suffrage at the Senate General Assembly.

1916

 February 17: A luncheon at the Naragansett Hotel is held in honor of Carrie Chapman Catt.
 March 6: The Congressional Union of Providence, Rhode Island is formed.
 The Rhode Island Union of Colored Women's Clubs endorses a federal suffrage amendment.
1917

 February 8: Another presidential suffrage bill is introduced.
 April 11: The presidential bill passes the general assembly Senate.
 April 17: The presidential suffrage bill passes both houses.
 April 18: Governor Robert Livingston Beeckman signs the presidential suffrage bill.

1920s 
1920

 January 6: Rhode island ratifies the Nineteenth Amendment.
 October 8: The League of Women Voters of Rhode Island is created.
1928

 Rhode Island abolishes the requirement of property-owning being tied to suffrage.

See also 

 List of Rhode Island suffragists
 New England Woman Suffrage Association
 Women's suffrage in Rhode Island
 Women's suffrage in the United States

References

Sources 
 
 

Rhode Island suffrage
Politics of Rhode Island
Timelines of states of the United States
Suffrage referendums